The University of Burgundy (uB; formerly known as Université de Dijon) is a public university located in Dijon, France.

The University of Burgundy is situated on a large campus (more than 150 ha) in the eastern part of Dijon called Campus Montmuzard, about 15 minutes by tram from the city centre. The humanities and sciences are well represented on the main campus, along with law, medicine, and literature in separate buildings. 
The IUT (Institute of technology) is also on the campus, providing specialist higher level diplomas in business, biology, communications and computer science.

The university counts 10 faculties, 4 engineering schools, 3 institutes of technology offering undergraduate courses, and 2 professional institutes providing post-graduate programmes.

With numerous student societies and good support services for international and disabled students, the campus is a welcoming place with numerous CROUS restaurants and canteens providing subsidised food and snacks.

Students
In 2018, the number of students was 30,917 divided into six areas, Dijon, Auxerre, Chalon-sur-Saône, Le Creusot, Mâcon and Nevers. The territorial areas (Dijon excepted) receive about 89% of the total of students. There are about 2 783 foreign students in 2018. 66% of the students are from Burgundy.

The CIEF (Centre International d'Études Françaises) allows students at all proficiency levels to immerse themselves in French language classes.

Points of interest 
 Serres de l'Université de Bourgogne

Notable faculty 

 Gaston Bachelard, French philosopher
 Louis Bachelier, French mathematician
 Pietro Balestra, economist
 Doug Beardsley, poet
 Gaspard Auguste Brullé, French entomologist
 Roland Carraz, former member of the French Parliament and former Secretary of state
 Lucien Febvre, French historian
 Robert M. French, French Cognitive scientist
 Robert Folz, French historian, medievalist, former Dean
 Henri Hauser, Economist, historian, geographer
 Albert Mathiez, French historian (Professor from 1919 to 1926)
 Bernard de Montmorillon, French economist, Former Dean at the Paris IX university (Dauphine)
 Jocelyne Pérard, President, University of Burgundy, 1993-98
 Louis Renault (jurist) (lecturer at this university, later Nobel Peace Prize Laureate)
 Jean Richard (historian), historian, member of the Institut de France, President of the Académie des Inscriptions et Belles-Lettres since 2002
 Albert Schatz, jurist, historian
 Bernard Schmitt, economist, founder of the school of economic thought known as quantum economics
 Aurélie Trouvé, President of ATTAC France

Notable alumni

 Mohammed A. Aldouri, former Permanent Representative of Iraq to the United Nations (2001–2003)
 Edvard Beneš, Former President of Czechoslovakia
 Igor and Grichka Bogdanov, French Television presenters, known for the Bogdanov affair
 Guy Canivet jurist, president of the Court of Cassation
 Chérie Carter-Scott, American author
 Antanas Mockus, Colombian mathematician, philosopher, and politician
 Rachida Dati, Member of the European Parliament, Keeper of the Seals, Minister of Justice
 Mahmoud El Materi, Former Minister (Tunisia)
 Jacques Fradin, Medical Doctor, cognitive and behavioural therapist
 Pierre Frogier, Politician, former President of the Government of New Caledonia
 Henri-François Gautrin, Member of National Assembly of Quebec
Adolé Isabelle Glitho-Akueson, Professor of Animal Biology at the University of Lome
 Léopold Gnininvi, Togolese politician, Secretary-General of the Democratic Convention of African Peoples
 Roger Guillemin, French National medal of Science in 1976, Nobel Prize for medicine in 1977
 Lawrence Gushee, American musicologist
 Mohammad-Ali Jamalzadeh, prominent Iranian writer
 Joseph Jacotot, philosopher, creator of the method of "intellectual emancipation"
 Alain Joyandet, politician, former Secretary of State for Cooperation and Francophony
 Henri Jayer, French vintner
 Roch Marc Christian Kaboré, President of Burkina Faso (2015–present)
 H. T. Kirby-Smith, American author and poet
 Faik Konitza, Albanian politician, stylist, critic.
 Georges-Louis Leclerc, Comte de Buffon, French naturalist, mathematician, cosmologist
 Kevin S. MacLeod, Usher of the Black Rod for the Canadian Senate
 Arnaud Montebourg, Deputy of the fifth district of Saône-et-Loire to the French National Assembly
 Lawrence Clark Powell, literary critic, bibliographer and author
 Carol Remond, award-winning journalist (Dow Jones Newswires), publisher of the Wall Street Journal.
 Aurélie Trouvé (fr), President of ATTAC France
 Pierre Viette, entomologist
 George Kennedy Young, deputy director of MI6
 Doina Bobeica, florist
 Maxime Touffet, director of Renon Inc.
 Chuka Umunna, British politician
 Robin Deiana, TV personality, breakdancer and model who lives and performs in South Korea; current cast member in the talk show Non-Summit
 Paul Bosc, chairman and founder of Château Des Charmes, recipient of the Order of Canada

See also 
 List of early modern universities in Europe

References

External links
Official website
Centre International d'Études Françaises

 
Universities in Bourgogne-Franche-Comté
Buildings and structures in Dijon
Education in Dijon
Educational institutions established in 1722
1722 establishments in France